Beverīna Municipality is a former municipality in Vidzeme, Latvia. The municipality was formed in 2009 by merging Brenguļi Parish, Kauguri Parish and Trikāta Parish the administrative centre being Mūrmuiža.

On 1 July 2021, Beverīna Municipality ceased to exist as it was merged into Valmiera Municipality. 

The municipality was geographically well positioned, bordering on Valmiera City, which is a city of republican importance. Beverīna County also shares borders with Burtnieki, Kocēni, Priekuļi, Smiltene and Strenči Counties.

Beverīna County is rich in valuable nature resources and culture and historical sites. Part of the county's territory is included in the Gauja National Park and Protected Landscape Area Ziemeļgauja. The River Gauja flows through all three civil parishes while its biggest tributaries the Abuls, Miegupe and Lisa not only provide great views, but are also closely related to historical events.

Population

See also 
 Administrative divisions of Latvia (2009)

References 

 
Former municipalities of Latvia